Independent Division of Yunnan Provincial Military Region(1st Formation) was formed on July 1, 1966 from Public Security Contingents of Yunnan province. The division was composed of four regiments (1st to 3rd infantry, artillery).

The division took part in the Sino-Vietnamese War under the command of 11th Army Corps.

On May 5, 1979 the division was renamed as 33rd Army Division and transferred to 11th Army Corps' control.

The division was disbanded in November 1985.

References

Infantry divisions of the People's Liberation Army
Military units and formations established in 1966
Military units and formations disestablished in 1985
1966 establishments in China
1985 disestablishments in China